The National Liberation Committee (CLN) was a political umbrella organization and the main representative of the Italian resistance movement fighting against Nazi Germany’s forces during the German occupation of Italy in the aftermath of the armistice of Cassibile, while simultaneously fighting against Italian Fascists during the Italian Civil War. It was a multi-party entity, whose members were united by their anti-fascism. The CLN coordinated and directed the Italian resistance and was subdivided into the Central Committee for National Liberation (CCLN) based in Rome and the later National Liberation Committee for Northern Italy (CLNAI) based in Milan.

History
The CLN was formed on 9 September 1943, following Italy's armistice and Germany's invasion of the country. The member parties were the Italian Communist Party, the Italian Socialist Party, the Action Party, the Christian Democracy, the Labour Democratic Party, and the Italian Liberal Party. With the backing of the Royal government and the Allied powers, CLN gained official recognition as the representative of the Italian resistance movement, and had several leaders operating underground in German-occupied Italy.

The partisan formations controlled by the CLN were primarily divided between three main groups, Communist Garibaldi Brigades, the Action Party's Justice and Freedom Brigades, and Socialist "Matteotti" Brigades. Smaller groups included Catholic and monarchist partisans. There were partisan units not represented in the CLN, including the Brigata Maiella and anarchist, republican and Trotskyist formations.

The CLN led the governments of Italy from the liberation of Rome in June 1944 until the first post-war general election in 1946.

Composition

Seats

See also
National Liberation Committee for Northern Italy
Italian Resistance

References

Anti-fascism in Italy
Anti-fascist organisations in Italy
World War II resistance movements
1943 establishments in Italy
1944 in Italy
1945 in Italy
Defunct political party alliances in Italy